Rabindranath Tagore University is a public state university located in Hojai, Hojai district, Assam. The university is established by Rabindranath Tagore University Bill, 2017 which was passed by the Government of Assam on 7 September 2017. It was created by upgradation of Hojai College of Hojai, Hojai district.

On 7 June 2019, Amalendu Chakraborty took charge as the first Vice-Chancellor of Rabindranath Tagore University. It was named after Rabindranath Tagore, a polymath, poet, musician, and artist from the Indian subcontinent.

The university offers undergraduate and postgraduate courses in various fields such as engineering, management, commerce, law, arts, science, and education.

References 

Universities in Assam
2019 establishments in Assam
Educational institutions established in 2019
State universities in India